Frómista is a municipality located in the province of Palencia, Castile and León, Spain. According to the 2009 data (INE), the municipality had a population of 822  inhabitants. In previous centuries, Frómista had a significant population supported by the farming of wheat.

It is a major overnight stopping place for pilgrims traveling along the Camino de Santiago, the Way of St. James.

The church of San Martín de Tours de Frómista was underwritten in part by the widow of Sancho el Mayor of Navarra who imported  artisans to build a church in the style of Jaca cathedral.

The other church in town Santa Maria del Castillo located near the train station, is considered redundant and is normally kept locked.

Main sights
Romanesque church of San Martín de Tours de Frómista (11th century).
Church of Santa Maria del Castillo, in Gothic-Renaissance style
Church of St. Peter (begun in the 15th century)

References

Municipalities in the Province of Palencia